The Devil Went Down to the Holy Land is Israeli groove metal band Betzefer's third full-length studio album, released in November 25, 2013. To fund the album's mixing and mastering, the band started a campaign on the Indiegogo website to raise money from donations by fans. During the campaign, the album was originally titled Suicide Hotline.

The album was mixed and mastered by Tue Madsen, who also mixed and mastered the band's first album Down Low, on September 2–9, 2012.

On September 11, 2012, the band revealed the album's track list, being made up from 14 tracks, the longest Betzefer album to date.

The band began working on several music videos for several songs off the album: a lyrics video for "I Hate" in October 2012, a stop motion animated video for "The Devil Went Down to the Holy Land" in December 2012, a live music video for "Can You Hear Me Now" in January 2013, as well as another live music video for "Sledgehammer" in April 2013.

On November 8, 2013, the band released the first single off the album: "The Devil Went Down to the Holy Land". It was released with a stop motion animated video directed by Ricardo Werdesheim. This video has over 10 million views on YouTube as of October 2021. A music video for the second single, "Sledgehammer", was released on November 29, 2013.

Track listing

Personnel
Avital Tamir – lead vocals
Matan Cohen – guitars
Rotem Inbar – bass
Roey Berman – drums, percussion

References 

2012 albums
Betzefer albums
SPV/Steamhammer albums
Albums produced by Tue Madsen
Crowdfunded albums